José Bezerra da Silva (February 23, 1927 in Recife, Pernambuco, Brazil – January 17, 2005 in Rio de Janeiro) was a Brazilian samba musician of the partido alto style.

Biography
Bezerra da Silva played zabumba as a child and sang coco in Recife. He moved to Rio de Janeiro in 1942, and in 1950, Rádio Clube do Brasil hired him as a session musician. In 1960 he became a member of the Orquestra Copacabana Discos of Sao Paulo, and in the 1970s and 1980s he performed with the Orquestra da TV Globo. He recorded his first singles in 1969, and went on to release 30 albums over the course of his career, charting many hits in his native country. His music often deals with political and social issues, touching on gang violence, the drug trade, and the law.

Bezerra became known for recording sambas from unfamed and marginalized composers, which were often people living in difficulties and dealing with criminal environments, who wrote with sharp irony. The label sambandido (samba + bandit) was sometimes used to refer to his work, and he strongly disliked the word. One of his greatest hits, which was rerecorded several times by various artists, is Malandragem Dá Um Tempo, whose chorus is I'm going to roll, but I won't light it now, an allusion to the efforts marijuana users make in order to avoid the law.

In 2001, he converted to the  Universal Church of the Kingdom of God. He died of a heart attack in 2005 at the age of 77.

Discography
 O Rei Do Côco (1976)
 Partido Alto Nota 10 Bezerra e Genaro (1977)
 Partido Alto Nota 10 Vol.2	- Bezerra e Seus Convidados (1979)
 Partido Alto Nota 10 Vol.3	- Bezerra e Rey	Jordão (1980)
 Partido Muito Alto (1980)
 Samba Partido e Outras Comidas (1981)
 Bezerra e um Punhado de Bambas (1982)
 Produto do Morro (1983)
 É Esse Aí Que É o Homem (1984)
 Malandro Rife (1985)
 Alô	Malandragem, Maloca o Flagrante (1986)
 Justiça Social (1987)
 Violência	Gera Violência (1988)
 Se Não Fosse o Samba (1989)
 Eu não sou Santo (1990)
 Partideiro	da Pesada (1991)
 Presidente Caô Caô (1992)
 Cocada Boa (1993)
 Bezerra, Moreira e Dicro - Os 3 Malandros In Concert (1995)
 Contra O VERDADEIRO Canalha	(Bambas	Do Samba) (1995)
 Meu	Samba É Duro na	Queda (1996)
 Eu Tô de Pé (1998)
 Provando e Comprovando sua Versatilidade (1998)
 Bezerra da Silva: Ao Vivo (1999)
 Malandro é Malandro	e Mané é Mané (2000)
 A Gíria é Cultura do Povo (2002)
 Caminho de Luz (2003)
 Pega Eu (2003)
 Meu	Bom Juiz (2003)
 O Partido Alto do Samba (2004)
 Série Maxximum - Bezerra da Silva (2005)
 O Samba Malandro de Bezerra da Silva (2005)

See also
Music of Brazil

References

[ Bezerra da Silva] at Allmusic.com

1927 births
2005 deaths
Brazilian percussionists
People from Recife
Samba musicians
20th-century Brazilian male singers
20th-century Brazilian singers